Constitutional Convention elections were held in the Federated States of Micronesia on 5 November 2019. The elections were held following a referendum in March 2019, in which 61% of voters voted in favour of calling a convention.

The Convention had 24 delegates; 11 from Chuuk State, 7 from Pohnpei State and three each from Kosrae State and Yap State.

Results

References

Micronesia
2019 in the Federated States of Micronesia
Elections in the Federated States of Micronesia